The St. Croix River is any of several rivers in North America:

 St. Croix River (Maine–New Brunswick) that forms part of the international boundary between Maine and New Brunswick
 St. Croix River (Wisconsin–Minnesota) that forms part of the border between Wisconsin and Minnesota
 St. Croix River (Nova Scotia), a tidal river in Hants County, Nova Scotia